Oscar Junior Baldomar Roca (born 16 January 1996) is a Bolivian professional footballer who plays for Nacional Potosí in the Bolivian Primera División.

Club career
Having been developed through the academy at Club Bolivar, initially as a winger, Baldomar
joined Universitario de Sucre in 2017. In January 2021 Baldomar signed for Club Blooming on a one year contract. He joined Nacional Potosí in December 2021.

International career
On May 28, 2018 he made his debut for the Bolivia national football team against the United States national football team.

References

External links
 
 

1996 births
Living people
Bolivian footballers
Association football defenders
Bolivia international footballers
Bolivia youth international footballers
Club Bolívar players
Universitario de Sucre footballers
Sport Boys Warnes players
Sportspeople from Santa Cruz de la Sierra
Bolivian Primera División players